Eleftheria Hatzinikou (born ) was a Greek female volleyball player. She was part of the Greece women's national volleyball team.

She competed with the national team at the 2002 FIVB Volleyball Women's World Championship in Germany, and at the 2004 Summer Olympics in Athens, Greece. She played with Filathlitikos in 2004.

Clubs
  Filathlitikos (2004)
  Panathinaikos (2007-2010)

See also
 Greece at the 2004 Summer Olympics

References

External links
http://hoa.org.gr/?p=1194&lang=en
http://www.cev.lu/Competition-Area/PlayerDetails.aspx?TeamID=2762&PlayerID=1832&ID=75
http://usatoday30.usatoday.com/sports/olympics/athens/results.aspx?rsc=VOW400A06

1978 births
Living people
Greek women's volleyball players
Panathinaikos Women's Volleyball players
Place of birth missing (living people)
Volleyball players at the 2004 Summer Olympics
Olympic volleyball players of Greece